This list of tallest buildings in Macau ranks skyscrapers in Macau, Special administrative regions of China by height.

Tallest buildings

This includes spires and architectural details but does not include antenna masts. Existing structures are included for ranking purposes based on present height. The tallest structure overall is currently the Macau Tower, which is used as both a viewing platform and telecommunications antenna.

* Indicates still under construction, but has been topped out.

Tallest under construction, approved, and proposed

Under construction
This lists buildings that are under construction in Macau and are planned to rise at least . Buildings that have already been topped out are also included.

* Table entries without text indicate that information regarding building heights, and/or dates of completion has not yet been released.

Approved
This lists buildings that are approved for construction in Macau and are planned to rise at least .

* Table entries without text indicate that information regarding building heights, and/or dates of completion has not yet been released.

Proposed
This lists buildings that are proposed for construction in Macau and are planned to rise at least .

* Table entries without text indicate that information regarding building heights, and/or dates of completion has not yet been released.

References
General
Emporis.com - Macau
Specific

External links
 Diagram of Macau skyscrapers on SkyscraperPage
 Tallest buildings of Macau on Emporis
 Skyscrapers of Macau on Gaoloumi (in Chinese)

Macau
 
Tallest